is a railway station in the city of Hirosaki, Aomori, Japan, operated by the private railway operator Kōnan Railway Company.

Lines

Station layout
Hirosaki-Higashikōmae Station has a one side platform serving a single bi-directional track. The station building is attended during normal working hours.

Adjacent stations

History

The station opened on September 7, 1927, initially as a simple stop named . It became a full station from March 18, 1929, and renamed  on June 17 of the same year. On April 1, 1988, the station was renamed , and it was renamed Hirosaki-Higashikōmae Station on April 1, 2005.

Surrounding area
Hirosaki-Higashi High School
Hirosaki Athletic Park and Sports Recreation Centre

See also
 List of railway stations in Japan

References

External links

 
Location map 

Railway stations in Aomori Prefecture
Konan Railway
Hirosaki
Railway stations in Japan opened in 1929